Now was a British television channel transmitted as part of the British Satellite Broadcasting service during 1990.

History
The Now channel was originally designed to be a live 24-hour news channel similar to CNN and Sky News, with its content provided by ITN. Between the awarding of the franchise and the launch of the channel, ITN withdrew its involvement with BSB after failing to reach an agreement on how to provide its news service and the Now channel's remit was changed to a mix of daytime lifestyle shows, current affairs programming, and arts programmes at weekends. The channel was promoted under the slogan "The Channel For Living". Now was broadcast throughout BSB's short spell on air from March to December 1990 on the Marcopolo satellites.

On 2 November 1990, BSB merged with Sky to form British Sky Broadcasting, they decided to streamline the channels available on both services. Now was replaced with Sky News, which Sky Television had broadcast on the Astra 1A satellite.

Now ceased broadcasting on Saturday 1 December 1990 at 1.00am – the first of the five BSB channels to close. As there were still arts programmes yet to be shown on Now, BSkyB broadcast Sky Arts as a weekend-only opt-out of the Sky News service on the Marcopolo satellite. Once all shows were broadcast, Sky Arts was closed, though the name itself eventually returned in March 2007 when the channel Artsworld, which was taken over by BSkyB in June 2005, was relaunched.

Programming
Now featured a mix of talk and chat shows, documentaries, news, current affairs and arts programming. As with all of BSB's other channels, Now carried short BSB News bulletins throughout the day.

One of Now's most memorable programmes was Now Sir Robin fronted by ex-Question Time presenter Sir Robin Day, which later transferred to Sky News. The programme covered the week's political happenings and confrontations. Now broadcast a number of theatre and classical music performances during its short period on-air. Arts programming featured on most nights.

Sky Arts (Original)

Originally, Sky Arts were planned as a full channel on the Astra 1A satellite at the beginning of the Sky Television service back in 1989. Promotional material broadcast during the launch indicated the channel would appear later that year along with Disney Channel. Neither channel launched at the time, Disney due to disputes with Sky, whilst arts programming (such as an early broadcast of the opera Carmen) was instead broadcast on Sky One.

Following the merger of British Satellite Broadcasting and Sky Television to form British Sky Broadcasting in 1990, they replaced with Sky News. However, contracts were still in place for some shows intended for the Now channel to be shown by BSkyB, occasionally opting out of the regular Sky News service during weekends on the Marcopolo satellite (which was owned by BSB prior to the merger and which carried Now) and showing the programmes as part of a weekend service entitled 'Sky Arts'. The service was only seen by former BSB viewers, since Sky Arts did not interrupt Sky News on the existing Astra satellite service.

After all outstanding programmes had been broadcast, the full Sky News service was broadcast on both Marcopolo and Astra and Sky Arts ceased to broadcast.

References

External links
 Now at TVARK

Sky television channels
Defunct television channels in the United Kingdom
Television channels and stations established in 1990
Television channels and stations disestablished in 1990
1990 in the United Kingdom
1990 in British television
1990s in the United Kingdom
1990s in British television
History of television in the United Kingdom